Acephaly (in Greek: a = without / képhalê = head) is a term used to define:
In medicine:
 in forensic medicine: a decapitated corpse whose head has not been found
 Twin reversed arterial perfusion
 an animal without a head. For example:
 Great scallop
 Maggot, the larva of the fly
 a relatively complete sculpture, the head of which has not been found. For example:
 Winged Victory of Samothrace
 Venus of Arles
 :Commons:Category:Headless statues